"Puedes Contar Conmigo" ("You Can Count On Me") is a song written by Amaia Montero and performed by La Oreja de Van Gogh. It was released in April, 2003, as the first single from their third studio album Lo Que Te Conté Mientras Te Hacías La Dormida. While the singer remembers  ("winter afternoons in Madrid"), the lyrics tells the story of a person who ends a relationship and does not want her ex-partner to think that he can no longer count on her. She wants him to know for all the good times during the relationship that "he can always count on her", although she also hints that she still hopes for him to return.

The song is considered one of the band's signature songs.

The single reached the No.1 spot for several weeks on the Spain, Mexico, Chile, Uruguay and Argentina Top 40 charts.

The song achieved a number 5 position on the US Latin Tracks chart and a number 3 on the US Latin Pop Airplay chart.

External links
 Lyrics with English translation

2003 singles
Number-one singles in Spain
Songs written by Amaia Montero
2002 songs
Sony BMG singles
La Oreja de Van Gogh songs